Sir Cecil Walter Paget   (19 October 1874 – 9 December 1936), was an English locomotive engineer and railway administrator. Cecil Paget was the son of Sir George Ernest Paget, Chairman of the Midland Railway Company (MR) 1890-1911. 

He was born in Sutton Bonington, Nottinghamshire, educated at Harrow and Pembroke College, Cambridge, and then joined the MR as an engineering pupil of S. W. Johnson, the company's Locomotive Superintendent. Paget rose quickly to become Works Manager at the main Derby Works from 1904, under Johnson's successor R. M. Deeley. He was also Deeley's deputy.

Promotion
April 1907 saw Paget appointed General Superintendent of the MR by the new General Manager Guy Granet. The role, which would now be called Chief Operating Officer, was expanded from that of the previous 'Superintendent of the Line' and put him in charge of the daily running of the locomotive department, which was formerly a responsibility of his erstwhile boss, Deeley. The appointment was also open to charges of nepotism against his father. This inevitably led to some friction.

Paget locomotive

Interest in possible developments of the classic steam locomotive led Paget to design and build a 2-6-2 steam locomotive with many novel features (8 single-acting cylinders, rotary valves, etc.) at Derby. He financed this from his own pocket, and work began in 1906 while he was Works Manager. When Paget ran out of money for his experimental locomotive, it was completed by the MR at an additional cost of £1,500, but, without the close supervision of Paget, and probably because of the animosity of Deeley, there was inadequate testing and a lack of remedial work on the design. Work stopped in 1909 and the remains of the locomotive were scrapped in about 1915.

Traffic management
Paget's radical ideas were more successful in the sphere of traffic management and his introduction of train reporting, centralised traffic control and locomotive numbering by power type quickly reduced costs incurred by delays to trains.

Locomotive policy
A point of agreement with Deeley was the need for larger locomotives to haul heavier trains, but this policy failed to get past the company's board because of the capital expenditure required (particularly on replacing weak under-bridges).

Military service
He served in France with the Railway Operating Division in World War I, commanding operations in France and Belgium and rising to the rank of Lieutenant-Colonel in the Royal Engineers. His military awards were the DSO in 1916, the CMG in 1918 and he was Mentioned in Despatches. The French awarded him Officier de la Légion d'honneur and the Belgians their Officier de l'Ordre de la Couronne.

Family
In 1906 Cecil Paget married Lady Alexandra Osborne, fourth daughter of the 9th Duke of Leeds, and they restored a 17th-century hall at Kings Newton, near Melbourne, just south of Derby, as their home. Cecil lived there until his death. After the war Paget didn't return to railway work. He succeeded to the baronetcy in 1923, his elder brother George having been killed during the 1900 Transvaal campaign in the second Boer War. His wife obtained a divorce in 1925 and Paget subsequently married Florence, daughter of James Butt. He died in 1936, survived by his second wife, but without children, and was buried in the family plot at Marlepit Hill cemetery, Sutton Bonington.

Footnotes

References
 Barnes, E. G. (1969), The Midland main line, 1875–1922, London: George Allen and Unwin, 
 Beswic, Roger (2003) 'The gentry: the Paget family' Remembering Sutton Bonington, accessed 2009-08-16
 Derbyshire UK (2008), Kings Newton village in South Derbyshire: Information and photos Derbyshire UK accessed 2009-08-16
 Mills, Bob (2000), 'The Paget locomotive' in BackTrack, vol. 14, no. 1 (January), pp. 21–23
 Steam Index (2007), 'Deeley and Paget' Steam Index: locomotive history, accessed 2009-08-16
 'Paget, Cecil', in Who was who, 1929–1940, London: Adam and Charles Black, 1941

1874 births
1936 deaths
Alumni of Pembroke College, Cambridge
English railway mechanical engineers
Locomotive builders and designers
Midland Railway people
British Army personnel of World War I
People from Sutton Bonington
Royal Engineers officers
People educated at Harrow School

Baronets in the Baronetage of the United Kingdom
Companions of the Distinguished Service Order
Companions of the Order of St Michael and St George
Officiers of the Légion d'honneur
Officers of the Order of the Crown (Belgium)
Chief operating officers
People from King's Newton